Je suis malade may refer to:

 "Je suis malade" (song), a song by Dalida.
 Je suis malade (album), an album by Serge Lama.